Gibbula racketti is a species of sea snail, a marine gastropod mollusk in the family Trochidae, the top snails.

Description

The size of the shell varies between 4 mm and 8 mm. This species form differs from typical Gibbula tumida in the constant smaller size, fewer whorls (4 to 5), and generally more solid and deeply colored shell. It is variable in proportions, frequently as broad or broader than long.

Distribution
This species occurs in the Mediterranean Sea and in the Atlantic Ocean off Portugal.

References

 Brusina S., 1865: Conchiglie dalmate inedite; Verhandlungen der Kaiserlich-königlichen Zoologisch-botanisch Gesellschaft in Wien 15: 3–42
 Nordsieck F., 1982: Die europäischen Meeres-Gehäuseschnecken. 2. Auflage; Gustav Fischer, Stuttgart 539 pp., 38 pl

External links
 
 Brusina S. (1865). Conchiglie dalmate inedite. Verhandlungen der Kaiserlich-königlichen Zoologisch-botanisch Gesellschaft in Wien 15: 3-42
 Monterosato T. A. (di), 1888–1889: Molluschi del Porto di Palermo. Specie e varietà; Bullettino della Società Malacologica Italiana, Pisa 13 (1888[1889?): 161–180 14 (1889): 75–81]
 Risso A., 1826–1827: Histoire naturelle des principales productions de l'Europe Méridionale et particulièrement de celles des environs de Nice et des Alpes Maritimes; Paris, Levrault Vol. 1: XII + 448 + 1 carta [1826. Vol. 2: VII + 482 + 8 pl. (fiori) [novembre 1827]. Vol. 3: XVI + 480 + 14 pl. (pesci) [settembre 1827]. Vol. 4: IV + 439 + 12 pl. (molluschi) [novembre 1826]. Vol. 5: VIII + 400 + 10 pl. (altri invertebrati) [Novembre 1827] ]
 Payraudeau B. C., 1826: Catalogue descriptif et méthodique des Annelides et des Mollusques de l'île de Corse; Paris pp. 218 + 8 pl
  Bucquoy E., Dautzenberg P. & Dollfus G., 1882–1886: Les mollusques marins du Roussillon. Tome Ier. Gastropodes.; Paris, J.B. Baillière & fils 570 p., 66 pl. [pp. 1–40, pl. 1–5, February 1882; pp. 41–84, pl. 6-10, August 1882; pp. 85–135, pl. 11–15, February 1883; pp. 136–196, pl. 16–20, August 1883; pp. 197–222, pl. 21–25, January 1884; pp. 223–258, pl. 26–30, February 1884; pp. 259–298, pl. 31–35, August 1884; pp. 299–342, pl. 36–40, September 1884; p. 343–386, pl. 41–45, February 1885; p. 387–418, pl. 46–50, August 1885; pp. 419–454, pl. pl. 51–60, January 1886; p. 455–486, pl. 56–60, April 1886; p. 487–570, pl. 61–66, October 1886 ]
 Locard, A. (1904). Coquilles des Mers d'Europe. Turbinidæ. Annales de la Société d'Agriculture, Sciences et Industrie de Lyon. 8(1): 31-89
 Gofas, S.; Le Renard, J.; Bouchet, P. (2001). Mollusca, in: Costello, M.J. et al. (Ed.) (2001). European register of marine species: a check-list of the marine species in Europe and a bibliography of guides to their identification. Collection Patrimoines Naturels, 50: pp. 180–213

racketti
Gastropods described in 1826